KXLW (96.3 The Moose) is a commercial country music radio station in Houston, Alaska, broadcasting to the Anchorage, Alaska area on 96.3 FM.  It is owned by Ohana Media.  Its studios are located in Downtown Anchorage and its transmitter is in Eagle River, Alaska.

The station adjusted its format from a hybrid of classic rock and country music to a mix of contemporary and classic country hits in October 2010.

On March 21, 2016, KXLW rebranded as "96.3 The Moose", and shifted its playlist to an ‘80s/‘90s country based format.

References

External links

Ohana Broadcast Company, LLC stations
XLW
Country radio stations in the United States
Radio stations established in 2003